Danjou is a surname. Notable people with the surname include:

Félix Danjou (1812–1866), French organist, composer-arranger and  organist
Frédéric Danjou (born 1974), French footballer
Isabelle Danjou (born 1969), French rower
Jean Danjou (1828–1863), French military personnel of the Crimean War

See also
Quartier Captaine Danjou, is a barracks in Castelnaudary in France